Bhagalpur division is an administrative geographical unit of Bihar state of India, with Bhagalpur as the administrative headquarters of the division.  , the division consists of Bhagalpur district, Banka district and is located on the bank of Ganga River.

See also

Mithila (region)
Divisions of Bihar
Districts of Bihar

Note
Population data obtained from the sum of the populations of the districts.

References

 
Divisions of Bihar
Divisions of British India